The 2021 Tulane Green Wave football team represented Tulane University in the 2021 NCAA Division I FBS football season. The Green Wave played their home games at Yulman Stadium in New Orleans, Louisiana, and competed in the American Athletic Conference. They were led by sixth-year head coach Willie Fritz.

Previous season

The Green Wave finished the 2020 campaign with an overall record of 6–5; they were 3–5 in AAC play to finish in eighth place in the conference. They received an invitation to the Famous Idaho Potato Bowl, where they lost to Nevada 27–38.

Prior to the Potato Bowl, then Offensive Coordinator Will Hall accepted the head coaching role at Southern Miss. Chip Long was hired to replace Hall.

On December 10, Fritz announced the firing of defensive coordinator Jack Curtis. Chris Hampton was named the new defensive coordinator on December 18.

In March 2021, it was announced that Chris Watt would be the offensive line coach for Tulane.

Preseason

American Athletic Conference preseason media poll
The American Athletic Conference preseason media poll was released at the virtual media day held August 4, 2021. Cincinnati, who finished the 2020 season ranked No. 8 nationally, was tabbed as the preseason favorite in the 2021 preseason media poll.

Schedule

Schedule Source:

Game summaries

No. 2 Oklahoma

References

Tulane
Tulane Green Wave football seasons
Tulane Green Wave football